Hara is a small uninhabited island off the northern coast of Estonia in the Gulf of Finland with an area of  11 hectares. The highest point of the island is 13 meters above the sea level.

History
Prior to the Second World War, the island had a few families as permanent inhabitants and a small fish factory operated there. After the war, the small port facing the island on the mainland was taken over by the Soviet Navy and used as a naval training area. The island's inhabitants were removed and a Soviet submarine base was constructed with facilities to demagnetise the vessels' steel hulls.  The Soviets departed in 1991; the base remains, derelict.

Uninhabited islands of Estonia
Kuusalu Parish
Estonian islands in the Baltic